Giubega is a commune in Dolj County, Oltenia, Romania with a population of 4,000 people. It is composed of a single village, Giubega. It also included Galiciuica village until 2004, when it was split off to form a separate commune.

References

Communes in Dolj County
Localities in Oltenia